The UAB Blazers college football team represents the University of Alabama at Birmingham (UAB) in the East Division of Conference USA (C-USA). The program began in the 1991 season and spent two years as a National Collegiate Athletic Association (NCAA) Division III independent before transferring to Division II. After just three years in Division II, the school entered Division I-A, now known as the Football Bowl Subdivision (FBS). During this twenty-seven year period, the Blazers had five head coaches. The current head coach is Bryant Vincent, who has held the position since June 2022. UAB President Ray L. Watts announced the cancellation of the football program, due to financial strains. On June 24, 2022 Clark announced his retirement as head coach at UAB,  due to chronic back problems. Quote "I am stepping down, but I am not walking away, UAB football, the university and the city of Birmingham mean too much to me. My roots and my heart are here, and they will stay here. My future isn't completely clear, but I will remain active in causes I hold dear, including the Children's Harbor football game and the CoachSafely Foundation. I will be a champion for UAB and Birmingham, doing what I can to further their incredible progress." The Alabama native who became a standout high school coach in the state went 49-26 at UAB with two Conference USA championships, three division titles and four bowl appearances.

The school adopted the nickname "Blazers" for its sports programs in 1978, in preparation for the basketball program's inaugural season. On January 13 of that year, a campus election selected the name with about 50% of 2600-person vote of students, professors, and administration. The nickname was selected over the options of Barons, Warriors, or Titans. After two different mascots, the nickname became representative of Blaze the Dragon, the school's mascot since the 1995 season. The Blazers have played in 286 games over twenty-seven seasons, including the two-year cancellation. Watson Brown led the team to its first postseason game, the 2004 Hawaii Bowl. The Blazers have appeared in three other bowl games since then under Bill Clark, who led them to the program's first bowl victory in 2018. None of UAB's coaches has been enshrined in the College Football Hall of Fame. Bill Clark is the only UAB head coach to lead a UAB team to a conference championship.

Watson Brown served the longest time as head coach at twelve years, and leads in number of games coached (136), number of games won (62), and number of games lost (74). Garrick McGee served the shortest time of all coaches, at two years, and McGee coached the fewest games (24). Among conference play, Clark leads in conference win percentage at 0.727. Brown leads in conference games played (59) and conference games lost (29).

Key

Coaches

Notes

References 
General

 
 

Specific

Lists of college football head coaches

Alabama sports-related lists